The State Of The Nation EP is the second EP by The Generators. It was released on February, 2002, on Dead Beat Records on vinyl & TKO Records on CD.

Track listing 
All songs by Snow/Dagger except where noted...
 "Go Away"
 "Operation Salvation" (Osterberg/Dagger)
 "Tough As Nails"
 "Fantastic Disaster"
 "Here Comes The Plaque"
 "Kill The President (Voices in His Head)"
 "Running Riot (Live)" (Cock Sparrer cover)
 "Hanoi 68 (Live)" (Doosky/Dagger)

Credits 
Doug Dagger – lead vocals
Sir Doosky – lead & rhythm guitars, back up vocals
Mike Snow – lead & rhythm guitars, back up vocals
Don Osterberg- bass & backing vocals
Mike Clark – drums & backing vocals

External links 
 

The Generators albums
2002 EPs
Punk rock EPs